Paul Collins Appiah Ofori is a Ghanaian politician and was the Member of Parliament for the Asikuma-Odoben-Brakwa electorate in the Central Region of Ghana.

Early life and education 
Appiah-Ofori was born on 19 August 1943. He hails from Breman Asikuma in the Central Region of Ghana. He graduated from the Institute of Chartered Secretaries and Administrators, London.

Employment 
Appiah-Ofori worked as the chief executive officer for SIO Industries in Aseba, Delta State, Nigeria from 1987 to 1996.

Politics 
He was first chosen to speak and be a representative to the body electorate in 1996 and held his seat in the 2000, 2004 and 2008 Ghanaian parliamentary political decision elections. He is an individual from the New Patriotic Party. He was elected as the Member of Parliament for the Asikuma-Odoben-Brakwa constituency in the 5th parliament of the 4th republic of Ghana. He was elected with 18,908 out of the 37,015 valid votes cast, equivalent to 48.9% of the total valid votes cast. He was elected against Georgina Nkrumah Aboah of the National Democratic Congress, Anthony Robert Frempong of the Democratic Freedom Party and Comfort Willson Aggrey of the Convention People's Party. These obtained 47.88%, 1.29% and 1.95% respectively of total valid votes cast.

Personal life 
Appiah-Ofori is married with three children. He is a Christian(Methodist).

External links 
 https://www.myjoyonline.com/news/pc-appiah-ofori-faces-expulsion-from-npp/
 https://www.businessghana.com/site/news/politics/214234/P-C-Appiah-Ofori-kicks-against-compilation-of-new-voters-register

References

1952 births
Living people
New Patriotic Party politicians
Ghanaian MPs 1997–2001
Ghanaian MPs 2001–2005
People from Central Region (Ghana)
Ghanaian MPs 2005–2009
Ghanaian MPs 2009–2013